National Unity may refer to the following political parties:

 National Unity Party (Albania)
 National Unity (Armenia) 
 National Unity (Azerbaijan)
 National Unity (Czech Republic)
 National Unity (Greece)
 National Unity (Ireland)
 National Unity (Peru)

See also
 
 National Unity Party (disambiguation)
 National unity government
 Nasjonal Samling ('National Rally'), a Norwegian far-right party 
 Quebec sovereignty movement